T'akaq (Quechua t'akay to scatter, to spread, -q a suffix, "scattered, spread / the one that scatters", Hispanicized spellings Tacacc, Tacaj), Takaq (Quechua takay to hit, "hit / the one that hits") or T'aqaq (Quechua t'aqay to separate, "separated / the one that separates") is a nearly  mountain with an archaeological site of the same name in Peru. It is situated in the Huánuco Region, Yarowilca Province, Chavinillo District, near Chavinillo.

See also 
 Waruq

References 

Archaeological sites in Huánuco Region
Archaeological sites in Peru
Mountains of Peru
Mountains of Huánuco Region